The 1997 European Community Championships was a men's tennis tournament played on indoor carpet courts at the Sportpaleis Antwerp in Antwerp, Belgium and was part of the Championship Series of the 1997 ATP Tour. The tournament ran from 17 February through 23 February 1997.

Champions

Men's singles

 Marc Rosset defeated  Tim Henman 6–2, 7–5, 6–4
 It was Rosset's 1st title of the year and the 18th of his career.

Men's doubles

 David Adams /  Olivier Delaître defeated  Sandon Stolle /  Cyril Suk 3–6, 6–2, 6–1
 It was Adams' only title of the year and the 10th of his career. It was Delaître's only title of the year and the 8th of his career.

References

External links
 ITF tournament edition details

European Community Championships
ECC Antwerp